Salix pentandra, the bay willow, is a species of willow native to northern Europe and northern Asia. The scientific name refers to the male flowers having five stamens. The English name derives from the resemblance of the leaves to those of the bay laurel; other common names include bay-leaved willow and laurel willow. Its glossy leaves make it more decorative than many other willows, so it is often planted as an ornamental tree.

Description

The fruit is a small capsule containing numerous minute seeds embedded in white down which aids wind dispersal.

Distribution and habitat
The bay willow occurs naturally in northern Europe and northern Asia. In the British Isles it is most common in Scotland and northern England and is sometimes planted as an ornamental tree elsewhere. It grows beside rivers and streams, on marshy ground and in wet woodland. It occurs beside Llyn Bedydd in Wrexham County Borough, Wales, an uncommon plant in the area.
It has become locally naturalised in northern North America, and is known as laurel willow there.

Ecology
The foliage is the food plant for the larvae of several species of moth, including Ectoedemia intimella whose larvae mine the leaves. The catkins are attractive to bees and other insects for the nectar and pollen they produce early in the year. This willow is susceptible to watermark disease, which causes branches to die back, and is caused by the pathogenic bacterium Brenneria salicis.

References

External links
 
 

pentandra
Flora of Asia
Flora of Europe
Plants described in 1753
Taxa named by Carl Linnaeus